High-mobility group protein HMG-I/HMG-Y is a protein that in humans is encoded by the HMGA1 gene.

Function 

This gene encodes a non-histone chromatin protein involved in many cellular processes, including regulation of inducible gene transcription, DNA replication, heterochromatin organization,  integration of retroviruses into chromosomes, and the metastatic progression of cancer cells.

HMGA1 proteins are quite small (~10-12 kDa) and basic molecules, and consist of three AT-hooks with the RGRP (Arg-Gly-Arg-Pro) core  motif, a novel cross-linking domain located between the second and third AT-hook, and a C-terminal acidic tail characteristic for the HMG family comprising HMGA, HMGB and HMGN proteins.

HMGA1-GFP fusion proteins are highly dynamic in vivo (determined using FRAP analysis), but in contrast also show nanomolar affinity to AT-rich DNA in vitro (determined biochemically), which might be explained due to the extensive post-transcriptional modifications in vivo. HMGA1 preferentially binds to the minor groove of AT-rich regions in double-stranded DNA using its AT-hooks. It has little secondary structure in solution but assumes distinct conformations when bound to substrates such as DNA or other proteins. HMGA1 proteins have high amounts of diverse posttranslational modifications and are located mainly in the nucleus, especially in heterochromatin, but also in mitochondria and the cytoplasm.

Recently it has been shown that HMGA1 proteins, HMGA1a and HMGA1b, can cross-link DNA fibers in vitro and can induce chromatin clustering in vivo suggesting a structural role of HMGA1 proteins in heterochromatin organization.

At least seven transcript variants encoding two different isoforms (HMGA1a, HMGA1b) have been found for this gene. The splice variant HMGA1c with only two AT hooks and no acidic tail is in discussion to be a real member of the HMGA family.

Mice lacking their variant of HMGA1, i.e., Hmga1-/- mice, are diabetic, show a cardiac hypertrophy and express low levels of the insulin receptor.

Interactions 

HMGA1 has been shown to interact with CEBPB and Sp1 transcription factor.

See also 
 HMGA
 AT-hook

References

Further reading

External links 
 
 

Transcription factors